Tennessee's 2nd Senate district is one of 33 districts in the Tennessee Senate. It has been represented by Republican Art Swann since his 2017 appointment to replace fellow Republican Doug Overbey.

Geography
District 2 lies to the southeast of Knoxville, covering all of Blount County and most of Sevier County in the Great Smoky Mountains. Communities in the district include Maryville, Gatlinburg, Pigeon Forge, Alcoa, Seymour, Eagleton Village, and most of Sevierville.

The district is split between Tennessee's 1st and 2nd congressional districts, and overlaps with the 8th, 12th, 17th, and 20th districts of the Tennessee House of Representatives. It borders the state of North Carolina.

Recent election results
Tennessee Senators are elected to staggered four-year terms, with odd-numbered districts holding elections in midterm years and even-numbered districts holding elections in presidential years.

2020

2018
Following Republican Doug Overbey's appointment as U.S. Attorney for the Eastern District of Tennessee in 2017, fellow Republican Art Swann was appointed to replace him. Per Tennessee state law, Swann had to run in an off-cycle election in 2018 to retain the seat for the remainder of Overbey's term.

2016

2012

Federal and statewide results in District 2

References 

2
Blount County, Tennessee
Sevier County, Tennessee